Tirador is a 2007 film directed by Brillante Mendoza. Produced by the Centerstage Productions, the film shows the political undertones of the Filipinos who are living in poverty.

Plot 
The movie revolves around the lives of Rex, Caloy, Leo and Odie in the streets of Quiapo, Manila. Quiapo is known to be one of the most crowded, depressed and notorious areas in Manila. The movie was set during Holy Week and the 2007 elections that showed both the political and religious stands of a typical Filipino in the slums. The low-life  criminals are portrayed in a way that humanizes them, and was compared to the corrupt and hypocritical politicians who exploits the poor.

Cast 
 Jiro Manio as Odie
 Coco Martin as Caloy 
 Kristoffer King as Rex
 Nathan Lopez as Leo
 Harold Montano as Rod
 Jaclyn Jose as Zeny
 Julio Diaz as Diego

Production 
The movie was produced by Centerstage Productions, Rollingball Entertainment and Ignite Media. Tirador was distributed in the Philippines through the same production in 2007 and was also shown internationally in France through Swift Distribution and Peccadillo Pictures in 2009 in UK.

Themes and Symbolism

Low-life and one-dimensional characters 
The movie showed the cruelty of the society and how a regular Filipino, living in the slums survives another day.

Machismo 
Tirador showed how men are forced into machismo, and how weak a human soul is. Evil has its own way to corrupt the minds of people in all social classes because of strong and selfish human urges.

Impact 
The main actors played realistic roles, that mirrored how men live in the slum area. The movie exposed the contrasts of corruption in all classes, where the influential was placed in the hot seat. It also showed the difference of societal levels and the animalistic instinct of humans to survive.

References

External links
 

2007 films
Filipino-language films
2000s Tagalog-language films
2000s crime drama films
Philippine crime drama films